The House of Carafa or Caraffa is the name of an old and influential Neapolitan aristocratic family of Italian nobles, clergy, and men of arts, known from the 12th century.

History 

The House of Carafa is a cadet branch of the noble House of Caracciolo, one of the most prominent families of the Neapolitan nobility. The family rose to prominence in the Kingdom of Naples during the 14th century and established itself as one of the leading noble families of southern Italy in the 15th century. Across the time, the family split in many lines, the most important being the Princes of Roccella, the Dukes of Andria and Counts of Ruvo, the Princes of Stigliano, the Dukes of Maddaloni, the Dukes of Nocera and the Dukes of Noja. The family gave sixteen cardinals to the Catholic Church, including one pope, Paul IV.

Notable members 
 Oliviero Carafa (1430 – 20 January 1511), cardinal
 Giovanni Pietro Carafa (1476–1559), became Pope Paul IV from May 1555 until his death
 Gianvincenzo Carafa (1477-1541), cardinal
 Diomede Carafa (1492-1560), cardinal
 Carlo Carafa (1517-1561), cardinal, nephew of Pope Paul IV; executed under Pope Pius IV
 Giovanni Carafa, Duke of Paliano (died 1561), nephew of Pope Paul IV; executed under Pope Pius IV
 Antonio Carafa (1538–1591), cardinal, nephew of Pope Paul IV
 Alfonso Carafa (1540 – 1565), cardinal, grandnephew of Pope Paul IV
 Fabrizio Carafa (bishop) (1588–1651), Bishop of Bitonto
 Fabrizio Carafa (died 1590), Duke of Andria; murdered by composer Carlo Gesualdo (1566–1613), Prince of Venosa and Count of Conza, for having an affair with Gesualdo's wife
 Girolamo Caraffa (1564–1633), Marquis of Montenegro, a general in Spanish and Imperial service
 Decio Carafa (1556–1626), cardinal
 Pier Luigi Carafa (1581-1655), cardinal
 Porzia Carafa, mother of Pope Innocent XII (1615-1700)
 Giuseppe Carafa (died 1647), Neapolitan aristocrat who was killed in July 1647 during the early stages of the Revolt of Masaniello against Spanish Habsburg rule
 Vincenzo Carafa (1585-1649), Superior General of the Society of Jesus
 Francesco Maria Carafa (died in prison, 1642), 5th Duke of Nochera, a Knight of the Order of the Golden Fleece; Viceroy of Aragon and Viceroy of Navarre
 Gregorio Carafa (1615–1690), Grand Master of the Order of St. John from 1680–90
 Antonio Carafa (1646–1693); Imperial Field Marshal and Knight of the Order of the Golden Fleece
 Pierluigi Carafa (1677–1755), Dean of the College of Cardinals
 Francesco Carafa di Trajetto (1722-1818), cardinal
 Ettore Carafa (1767-1799), late 18th-century Neapolitan Republican
 Michele Carafa (1787-1872), 19th-century Italian composer
 Domenico Carafa della Spina di Traetto (1805–1879), cardinal

References

 
12th-century establishments in Italy
Papal families
Neapolitan nobility